Green turban may refer to:

 A Sufi Muslim head covering. See Turban#Islam
 Turbo marmoratus, a snail